Spoiler is a security vulnerability on modern computer central processing units that use speculative execution. It exploits side-effects of speculative execution to improve the efficiency of Rowhammer and other related memory and cache attacks. According to reports, all modern Intel Core CPUs are vulnerable to the attack . AMD has stated that its processors are not vulnerable.

See also 
 Transient execution CPU vulnerabilities
 Hardware security bug

References

External links 
 
 CVE-2019-0162 at National Vulnerability Database

Speculative execution security vulnerabilities
Hardware bugs
2019 in computing